The Oxford University Film Foundation (originally a charity registered as the Oxford Film Foundation) is the principal funding body and provider of film equipment for the many independent films made by students in Oxford, England. It provides a platform for showcasing student-made films via termly screenings and hosts other film-related events throughout the year, including talks from industry professionals and filmmaking workshops.

History and Alumni 
The society was founded in 1981 by Michael Hoffman, Peter Schwabach and Rick Stevenson.  Its first production was the 1982 feature film Privileged, starring Hugh Grant, James Wilby, Imogen Stubbs and Mark Williams. The film was directed by Michael Hoffman with John Schlesinger, produced by Rick Stevenson and Mark Bentley and with a score by Rachel Portman.

Some of the original founders of the Oxford Film Foundation, including Rick Stevenson, Michael Hoffman, Andy Paterson and Mark Bentley, went on to form the Oxford Film Company in 1984. The Oxford Film Company instituted Britain's first national screenwriting competition sponsored by Lloyds Bank and later produced a series of feature films, including Hilary and Jackie (1998), while the revived and renamed Oxford University Film Foundation continues to produce films with the students of Oxford University.

The Foundation produced The Third Sign in 1990, which went on to win the BP Film Expo, and the following year Greg Pak directed the noir, Lonely Street, produced by Matthew Rose and Andrew Lee.

References

External links 
Oxford University Film Foundation Website

Arts organizations established in 1981
Film Foundation
Film Foundation
Film organisations in England
Charities based in Oxfordshire
1981 establishments in England